The 1972 Toledo Rockets football team was an American football team that represented the University of Toledo in the Mid-American Conference (MAC) during the 1972 NCAA University Division football season. In their second season under head coach Jack Murphy, the Rockets compiled a 6–5 record (2–3 against MAC opponents), finished in a tie for fourth place in the MAC, and were outscored by all opponents by a combined total of 210 to 196.

Schedule

References

Toledo
Toledo Rockets football seasons
Toledo Rockets football